Antonios Karyofyllis (1904 – 1989) was a Greek athlete. He competed in the men's high jump at the 1924 Summer Olympics and the 1928 Summer Olympics.

References

External links
 

1904 births
1989 deaths
Athletes (track and field) at the 1924 Summer Olympics
Athletes (track and field) at the 1928 Summer Olympics
Greek male high jumpers
Olympic athletes of Greece
Place of birth missing